The Metro Bridge is the first metro bridge part of the Brovarsky prospect spanning across the Dnipro River in Kyiv, the capital of Ukraine. It was engineered by G. Fuks and Y. Inosov and constructed in 1965 with the expansion of the Kyiv Metro system. The bridge is used for both the Sviatoshynsko-Brovarska Line of the metro and for automobile traffic.

Overview
It consists of two spans as it links the Venetsiansky island as well as the left and right banks. The larger span consists of an elevated central metro span and side automobile spans on separate, lower estacades. Both the metro and automobile paths have a distinct arched contour. This was because the metro line continues into the hill of the right bank with the Dnipro station.

The smaller span called Rusanivsky Bridge, which links Venetsiansky island with the left bank, is a more conventional level estacade with two northern traffic lanes and a southern metro path.

Accidents 
A terrorist occupation of the bridge occurred on September 18, 2019.   A veteran of the Russian-Ukrainian War threatened to blow up the bridge. 
Traffic was stopped across the bridge for a few hours, causing extensive traffic issues throughout the city, before the man was arrested.  He was found not to be in possession of any explosive, just a rifle, with which he shot a police drone.

Photos

See also
 Bridges in Kyiv
 Nicholas Chain Bridge

References

External links

Railroad bridges in Kyiv
Road bridges in Kyiv
Bridges over the Dnieper
Kyiv Metro
Bridges built in the Soviet Union
Bridges completed in 1965
Landmarks in Kyiv
Bridges on Venetsiansky Island
1965 establishments in Ukraine